Ervin Thomas Rouse (September 19, 1917 – July 8, 1981) was an American fiddler and songwriter, largely known for his widely recorded "Orange Blossom Special" (1938) bluegrass standard. He also wrote the 1940s Moon Mullican hit "Sweeter Than The Flowers", which has also become a bluegrass standard.

References

1917 births
1981 deaths
American fiddlers
American male songwriters
20th-century American violinists
20th-century American male musicians